The Zam is a right tributary of the river Mureș in the historical region of Transylvania, Romania. It discharges into the Mureș in the village Zam.

References

Rivers of Romania
Rivers of Hunedoara County